Harald Platou (29 October 1877 – 23 September 1946) was a Norwegian fencer. He competed in the individual épée event at the 1912 Summer Olympics.

References

External links
 

1877 births
1946 deaths
Norwegian male épée fencers
Olympic fencers of Norway
Fencers at the 1912 Summer Olympics
Sportspeople from Oslo
20th-century Norwegian people